Nicholas Joseph Viall (born September 28, 1980) is an American actor, television personality and model who had a starring role on the 21st season of ABC's The Bachelor, after finishing as runner-up in two consecutive seasons of The Bachelorette.

Early life and education
Viall was born in Waukesha, Wisconsin, to parents Mary and Christopher. He is the second oldest of 11 siblings.

He graduated at Waukesha North High School in 1999, where he ran track and field and won the 800-meter run at WIAA State Track & Field Championships in the same year. He then attended University of Wisconsin–Milwaukee, where he served as team captain and set a school record in the 3,200-meter relay.

Television show appearances

Reality television

The Bachelorette

Viall first appeared as a contestant in the ABC reality show The Bachelorette in 2014, as one of Andi Dorfman's suitors. On the first night, he received the first impression rose. In the final dates, he confessed his love for Dorfman as one of the final two bachelors, but left heartbroken when Dorfman chose Josh Murray to receive the final rose.

In 2015, Viall returned for a second chance in the following season of The Bachelorette, when he was a guest in the fourth week at the New York City date with Bachelorette Kaitlyn Bristowe. He asked her to give him a chance, and she accepted his request to be part of the cast. Like the previous season, he made it to the final rose ceremony, but ended in proposal rejection when Bristowe chose Shawn Booth.

Bachelor in Paradise

Viall returned to reality TV once again as a part for the third season in Bachelor in Paradise. In the second episode, when he was asked on a date by The Bachelor season 20 contestant Leah Block, Viall accepted. Viall later asked fellow contestant Amanda Stanton on a date, much to Block's annoyance. After Stanton began a relationship with contestant Josh Murray, Viall went on to date Jen Saviano. The relationship between Saviano and Viall appeared to be progressing well, with Viall selecting an engagement ring with Neil Lane for a second time. However, at the final ceremony, Viall said, "I wanted to say I was in love with you, but something in my heart just said I can't," resulting in no proposal.

The Bachelor

In August 2016, Viall was announced as the star of the twenty-first season of The Bachelor on the fourth episode of the second season of Bachelor in Paradise: After Paradise. He was chosen despite not being a fan favorite to star on the show, beating contenders Chase McNary and Luke Pell, both from The Bachelorette (season 12). In the first episode, Viall revealed that he had thirty women on the show, instead of the usual twenty-five. Viall proposed to contestant Vanessa Grimaldi, a special education teacher from Montreal, Quebec, Canada in the season finale. They broke up the following August.

Dancing with the Stars

Viall became a contestant on the ABC reality show Dancing with the Stars and his partner is professional ballroom dancer Peta Murgatroyd along with 11 other celebrity contestants, which was announced by Good Morning America on March 1, 2017. He was eliminated from the competition on May 1.

Acting career
Viall made his acting debut in the 2017 Christmas television movie A Christmas Cruise, starring Vivica A. Fox, and has made guest television appearances in ABC's Speechless, and TV Land's Teachers. He also appeared on episodes of General Hospital in May 2018 for the Nurse's Ball.

Other ventures

Podcast
In January 2019 Viall started a podcast called The Viall Files that hosts many other celebrity guests.

Natural Habits Essential Oils
In 2018 Viall and his sister launched an essential oils company called Natural Habits.

Filmography

Television

References

External links 
 Official profile on ABC's The Bachelor site
 Official profile on ABC's Dancing With the Stars site
 

1980 births
Living people
People from Milwaukee
University of Wisconsin–Milwaukee alumni
Bachelor Nation contestants
Masked Singer